The 2010 Women's Junior South American Volleyball Championship was the 20th edition of the tournament, organised by South America's governing volleyball body, the Confederación Sudamericana de Voleibol (CSV). It was held in Envigado and Itagüí, Antioquia, Colombia. The winning national team qualified to the 2011 Junior World Championship alongside Peru who had already secured a berth as Host.

Competing nations
The following national teams qualified, they were seeded according to how they finished in the previous edition of the tournament:

First round

Pool A

|}

|}

Pool B

|}

|}

Final round

Championship

Semifinals

|}

Classification 5–7

|}

Fifth place

|}

Third place

|}

First place

|}

Final standing

Individual awards

Most Valuable Player

Best Spiker

Best Blocker

Best Server

Best Digger

Best Setter

Best Receiver

Best Libero

References

External links
CSV official website

South Am
S
Volleyball
V
Youth volleyball